The Duke Dog is the official mascot for the James Madison University Dukes. "Dukes" was made the official nickname in 1947, and was named after the University's president from 1919 to 1949, Samuel Page Duke. However, the bulldog was not chosen to represent the Dukes until the 1972–1973 school year.

After a decade of the original costume, Dr. Ray V. Sonner revamped the appearance of the Duke Dog in the 1982–83 school year. On November 28, 1982, Duke Dog appeared in JMU's first home game of the men's basketball season, against The Virginia Military Institute.

In 2004, Duke Dog was named a finalist for the Capital One Mascot Bowl.  After eleven weeks of voting, Duke Dog won its matchup each week to finish a perfect 11–0.  The next closest mascot finished with a record of 6–5. Although Duke Dog overwhelmingly won in polling, the contest was based also on scores from a panel of judges, and Monte from the University of Montana ended up winning the contest overall (ironically, JMU had just defeated Montana in the I-AA football championship less than a month prior).  Since this incident, Capital One has changed the contest so that the popular vote is the sole determinant of the winner of the Mascot Bowl.

On September 22, 2007, Duke Dog was tackled by Chanticleer, a chicken mascot from Coastal Carolina University. A fight between the mascots ensued, and the Duke Dog inadvertently struck one of the police officers who was trying to end the confrontation.  

The Duke Dog has established a long tradition of barking during JMU's fight song. After the lines "The fighting Dukes of JMU" and "We are the Dukes of JMU" of the JMU fight song, all students and alumni give 3 loud woofs.

James Madison University Fight Song lyrics:
Madison, James Madison,
We are the Dukes of JMU.
Madison, James Madison,
The fighting Dukes of JMU.
Fight for Glory -- Honors Won,
Brighten the Lights of Madison.
Madison, James Madison,
Show your Colors
Proud and True.
We are the Dukes of JMU!

References

External links 
 Duke Dog Pounding WHSV-TV

James Madison Dukes
Sun Belt Conference mascots